James Allen "Jumpy" Geathers (born June 26, 1960) is a former American football defensive tackle. At the time of his retirement, he was the only active player who played at Wichita State University, which discontinued its football program following the 1986 season, making him the last WSU football player to play in the NFL. Geathers was drafted by the New Orleans Saints with the 42nd overall selection in the second round of the 1984 NFL Draft.

Career
He played defensive tackle at Wichita State, and then for thirteen seasons in the National Football League (New Orleans Saints 1984-1989, Washington Redskins 1990-1993, Atlanta Falcons 1994-1995, and Denver Broncos 1996).  He was a part of the Redskins team that won Super Bowl XXVI. At 6' 7" and 290 pounds he was a forceful pass rusher, famous for his "forklift" rush, in which he picked up his blocker and carried him to the quarterback.  Despite bad knees later in his career, Geathers played well into his 30s.  Geathers' career was cut short when he ruptured his Achilles tendon during training camp with the Denver Broncos and spent the 1997 season on injured reserve, the same year the Broncos would go on to win the Super Bowl for the first time in franchise history. He retired with 62 sacks in 183 games. Geathers attended Choppee High School located in Georgetown, South Carolina.

References

External links

1960 births
Living people
American football defensive linemen
Atlanta Falcons players
Denver Broncos players
New Orleans Saints players
Washington Redskins players
Wichita State Shockers football players
Players of American football from South Carolina
People from Georgetown, South Carolina
Ed Block Courage Award recipients
Geathers family